The Congolese ambassador in Washington, D. C. is the official representative of the Government in Democratic Republic of Congo to the Government of the United States.

List of representatives

Democratic Republic of the Congo–United States relations

References 

 
United States
Congo Democratic Republic of the